The 2020 Volta ao Algarve was a road cycling stage race that took place in the Algarve region of Portugal between 19 and 23 February 2020. It was the 46th edition of the Volta ao Algarve and is rated as a 2.Pro event as part of the 2020 UCI Europe Tour and the 2020 UCI ProSeries.

Teams
Twenty-five teams were invited to the race. Of these teams, twelve are UCI WorldTour teams, five are UCI Professional Continental teams, and eight are UCI Continental teams. A total of 174 riders started the race, of which 163 finished.

UCI WorldTeams

 
 
 
 
 
 
 
 
 
 
 
 

UCI Professional Continental Teams

 
 
 
 
 

UCI Continental Teams

Route

Stages

Stage 1
19 February 2020 – Portimão to Lagos,

Stage 2
20 February 2020 – Sagres to Fóia,

Stage 3
21 February 2020 – Faro to Tavira,

Stage 4
22 February 2020 – Albufeira to Alto do Malhão,

Stage 5
23 February 2020 – Lagoa to Lagoa,  (ITT)

Classification leadership table

Classification standings

General classification

Points classification

Mountains classification

Young rider classification

Teams classification

References

External links

 

2020 UCI Europe Tour
2020 UCI ProSeries
2020 in Portuguese sport
2020
Volta ao Algarve